Sardar Madhavrao Vinayak Kibe (Devanagari: माधव विनायक किबे; 1877–?) was a scholar from Indore State, India. He was from the Karhade Brahmin Kibe family founded by Vithalrao Mahadeo Kibe, known as Tantya Jog, the Prime Minister to Maharaja Malhar Rao Holkar.

Education

He was the first alumnus of Daly College to pass. He obtained his B.A. degree in 1899 and M.A. degree 2 years later from the Muir Central College, Allahabad.

Work

After completing his education he served as an Honorary Secretary to the Indore darbar for a few years. Later, he was taken on the staff of the Agent of Governor-General in Central India as Honorary Attaché and Magistrate. In 1911, he was appointed to officiate as Diwan to the Raja Saheb of Dewas, Junior Branch. He was made a Rao Bahadur in June 1912.

He presided over Marathi Sahitya Sammelan held in Mumbai in 1926. He also attended Round Table Conference in London along with his spouse. He and his wife were the member of Congress.

Location of Lanka and Studies in Indian States Currencies were two among his works.

Personal life

Sardar Madhavrao Kibe was born to Vithalrao Kibe. Kibe's were Jagirdars and Sahukars. The saying goes Holkar ka raaj aur Kibe ka byaaj. He was married to Kamlabai Kibe who was a notable social worker. He has four children. The eldest daughter Indirabai was married to Bal Krishna Vasudev Bhadkamkar an I.C.S Officer. His son Sharad Kibe was married to Shakuntala bai Kibe who was a Patwardhan princess from Kurundwar junior. His younger daughter was married to I.C.S. Officer Narayan Dandekar. His granddaughter Layla raje Patwardhan was the Rajmata of Jamkhandi. His grandson, Ashok Bhadkamkar died as Indian Ambassador.

References

Scholars from Madhya Pradesh
1877 births
People from Dewas
Marathi people
Year of death missing
Rai Bahadurs
Politicians from Indore
20th-century Indian historians
Presidents of the Akhil Bharatiya Marathi Sahitya Sammelan
Scholars in British India
Historians in British India